Shawn Faulkner (born June 22, 1962) is a former American football running back who played four seasons in the Canadian Football League (CFL) with the Montreal Alouettes, Ottawa Rough Riders and Calgary Stampeders. He played college football at Western Michigan University. He was also a member of the Michigan Panthers, Oakland Invaders and Tampa Bay Storm.

Early years
Faulkner played high school football at Port Huron Central High School in Port Huron, Michigan. He also participated in track, twice qualifying for the state finals in the low hurdles and high jump. He was also named the team's Most Outstanding Runner. Faulkner also wrestled for two years.

College career
Faulkner played for the Western Michigan Broncos from 1980 to 1983. He was NCAA Division I-A's second leading rusher with 1,668 yards his senior season in 1983. He twice earned All-Mid-American Conference honors. Faulkner recorded career totals of 3,341 yards and 15 touchdowns on 761 rushing attempts.

Professional career
Faulkner played for the Michigan Panthers of the United States Football League (USFL) in 1984. He played in eighteen games for the USFL's Oakland Invaders during the 1985 season. He played in six games for the Montreal Alouettes of the CFL in 1986. Faulkner played in five games for the Ottawa Rough Riders of the CFL during the 1987 season. He played in eighteen games for the CFL's Calgary Stampeders from 1988 to 1989. He played for the Tampa Bay Storm of the Arena Football League in 1992.

References

External links
Just Sports Stats
College stats

1962 births
Living people
Players of American football from Michigan
American football running backs
Canadian football running backs
African-American players of American football
African-American players of Canadian football
Western Michigan Broncos football players
Michigan Panthers players
Oakland Invaders players
Montreal Alouettes players
Ottawa Rough Riders players
Calgary Stampeders players
Tampa Bay Storm players
People from Port Huron, Michigan
Sportspeople from Metro Detroit
21st-century African-American people
20th-century African-American sportspeople